Kempe's Engineers Year Book was for many years a standard reference work of practical engineering information in the United Kingdom, covering a wide range of subjects.

History 
First published in 1894 by H. R. Kempe with W. Hannaford-Smith and then published annually, except during World War II, until 2002, the book was a standard source of reference for civil, mechanical, electrical, marine, mining, and other engineers.

See also 
 Machinery's Handbook

References

External links 
 Kempe's Engineers Year Book, 1949, Vol. 1, Archive.org
 Kempe's Engineers Year Book, 1949, Vol. 2, Archive.org
 Kempe's Engineers Year Book, 1969, Vol. 2, Archive.org
 Kempe's Engineers Year Book, 1989, Vol. 1, Archive.org
 Kempe's Engineers Year Book, 1985, Archive.org

Engineering books
Yearbooks
Annual publications
Publications established in 1894
Publications disestablished in 2002